Ivatan may refer to:

 Ivatan people
 Ivatan language

Language and nationality disambiguation pages